The Tri-City ValleyCats (often shortened to Cats) are a professional independent baseball team based in Troy, New York. The Tri-City name refers to the three nearby cities of Albany, Schenectady, and Troy which make up New York State's Capital District.

From 2002 to 2020, they were members of Minor League Baseball's New York–Penn League (NYPL) as the Class A Short Season affiliate of the Houston Astros. With MLB's reorganization of the minor leagues after the 2020 season, the ValleyCats were not selected to continue in affiliated baseball. They joined the Frontier League for the 2021 season, which was designated as an MLB Partner League that year.

Team history

Before Tri-City
Prior to their arrival in Troy, the club was based first in Little Falls, New York, as the Little Falls Mets (1977–1988), and then in Pittsfield, Massachusetts, as the Pittsfield Mets (1989–2000) and Pittsfield Astros (2001).

2002 season
The ValleyCats played their first game on the road in Lowell, Massachusetts, on June 18, 2002, against their rival the Lowell Spinners. The Spinners had a 3–1 lead going into the eighth inning, but a triple by Aneudi Cuevas down the right field line drove in three runs leading the ValleyCats to a 5–4 victory.

2006 season

In their 2006 season, the ValleyCats registered an attendance of 129,126 in 37 contests, averaging 3,489 fans per game. On July 4, 2006, the ValleyCats set a new all-time home attendance mark as 6,123 people attended a game against the Lowell Spinners which was later broken in the following years.

2008 season

All-Star game
The Valley Cats hosted the fourth annual New York–Penn League All-Star Game at Joseph L. Bruno Stadium in 2008. The game was played between teams made up of the affiliates of National League (NL) and American League (AL) teams. The ValleyCats, affiliates of the National League's Houston Astros, were part of the NL squad. Four ValleyCats were voted to play in the game: first baseman Phil Disher, left fielder Jack Shuck, pitcher Philip Rummel, and center fielder Thomas Steele. However, Steele was injured two weeks before the game and was replaced by Tri-City third baseman David Flores. The NL All-Stars won the game on a walk-off RBI by Tri-City's David Flores. Flores was also voted MVP of the game.

No-hitter
On June 21, 2008, pitchers Shane Wolf, David Miller, and Ashton Mowdy combined to throw the first no-hitter in the franchise's history. Wolf is a native of nearby Lansing. The ValleyCats won, 10–0, over the Oneonta Tigers.

Attendance
On July 4, 2008, The ValleyCats broke their single-game attendance record drawing 6,630 to the ballpark, 2,130 more than the listed capacity. The ValleyCats won, 9–2, against the Jamestown Jammers. The team also set a season attendance record in 2008 with 140,631 fans in attendance despite missing many games due to rain.

2009 season
The ValleyCats once again broke attendance records in 2009. Their single-game attendance record was broken again on July 4 against the Brooklyn Cyclones. A crowd of 6,838 fans attended the 2–1 ValleyCats loss. They also set a new single season attendance record, attracting 145,976 fans to Joseph L. Bruno Stadium that season. Tri-City finished the season in fourth place in the Stedler Division, 18 games behind first-place Lowell.

2010 Championship season 
After three losing seasons, the ValleyCats finally turned around to be one of the front runners in the Stedler Division. Led by manager Jim Pankovits, they were the underdog in the 2010 NYPL playoffs with a 38–36 record, and having won their division by only a half game over the Connecticut Tigers. They reached the championship series for the third time in their short history, and beat the heavy favorite Brooklyn Cyclones (51–24), two games to none.

2015 season
The second no-hitter in ValleyCats history was thrown on August 6, 2015. Pitchers Kevin McCanna, Ralph Garza, and Zac Person combined for the road win against the Aberdeen IronBirds at Leidos Field at Ripken Stadium, 5–0.

2021 and beyond
After the cancelled 2020 minor league season, Major League Baseball took direct control of Minor League Baseball and discontinued short-season play. The ValleyCats were not among the teams invited to continue in affiliated baseball. On January 7, 2021, the team announced that it would be joining the Frontier League, an independent MLB Partner league, for the 2021 season. The 2021 and 2022 seasons were disappointing for the ValleyCats as they missed the playoffs both years.

Mascots

The ValleyCats have several mascots, the three most prominent being SouthPaw, his grandfather, Pappy, and his best friend, Ribbie. SouthPaw is a jersey-wearing cat, representing the "ValleyCat", the team's nickname. Another fan-favorite is Sammy Baseball who wears a patriotic costume and resembles Uncle Sam, reputedly derived from Samuel Wilson who operated a meat packing plant in Troy. The Tri-City Mayors, large caricature heads representing the current Mayors of Troy, Albany, and Schenectady, race (and dance) on a nightly basis at the ballpark. Ketchup, Mustard, and Relish mascots participate in a hot dog race. Other mascots include Spiedie the Chicken, Zoggy the Dinosaur, and Rowdy the River Rat, obtained when the Albany River Rats moved to Charlotte, North Carolina.

Season results

Postseason results
 2004: Defeated Brooklyn Cyclones, 2 games to 1; lost to Mahoning Valley Scrappers, 2 games to 0, in championship round.
 2006: Defeated Auburn Doubledays, 2 games to none; lost to Staten Island Yankees, 2 games to 1, in championship round.
 2010: Defeated Batavia Muckdogs, 2 games to 1; defeated Brooklyn Cyclones, 2 games to 0, in championship round.
 2012: Defeated Auburn Doubledays, 2 games to 1; lost to Hudson Valley Renegades, 2 game to 1, in championship round.
 2013: Defeated Aberdeen IronBirds, 2 games to 0; defeated State College Spikes, 2 games to 1, in championship round.
 2014: Defeated the Connecticut Tigers, 2 games to none; lost to the State College Spikes, 2 games to 1.
 2015: Lost semi-finals to Staten Island Yankees, 2 games to 0.
 2018: Defeated Mahoning Valley Scrappers, 2 games to 0; defeated Hudson Valley Renegades, 2 games to 0, in championship round.

Fast facts
 Total Attendance
 Joseph L. Bruno Stadium
 2002 – 108,409
 2003 – 103,984
 2004 – 110,497
 2005 – 116,674
 2006 – 129,126
 2007 – 136,809
 2008 – 140,631 (7th most in NY–Penn League).
 2009 – 145,976 (6th most in NY–Penn League).
 2010 – 155,315 (5th most in NY–Penn League).
 2011 – 156,279 (6th most in NY–Penn League).
 2012 – 159,966 (5th most in NY–Penn League).
 2013 – 156,712 (4th most in NY–Penn League).
 2014 – 161,171 (3rd most in NY–Penn League).
 2015 – 153,692 (3rd most in NY–Penn League).
 2016 – 149,847 (3rd most in NY–Penn League).
 2017 – 142,922 (3rd most in NY–Penn League).
 2018 – 140,036 (3rd most in NY–Penn League).
 2019 - 132,529 (3rd most in NY-Penn League).
 2020 - SEASON CANCELLED DUE TO COVID-19
 2021 - 100,519 (2nd most in Frontier League).
 Ballpark Dimensions
 LF – 325 feet (99 m)
 CF – 400 feet (122 m)
 RF – 325 feet (99 m)
 First Game
 Tuesday, June 18, 2002 vs Lowell Spinners (at LeLacheur Park, Lowell, Massachusetts – W5–4)
 Season Records (2002–present)
 Hits
 2005 – Neil Sellers (96)
 Doubles
 2003 – Brock Koman (25)
 Triples
 2007 – Collin DeLome (7)
 2017 – Andy Pineda (7)
 Home runs
 2004 – Mario Garza (15)
 Runs Batted In
 2004 – Mario Garza (65)
 Stolen Bases
 2015 – Johnny Sewald (31)
 Wins
 2004 – Ronnie Ventura (11)
 Saves
 2012 – Blake Ford (14)
 Strikeouts
 2003 – Matt Albers (94)

Current roster

Notable alumni
Former/Current notable baseball players who played for the ValleyCats as a minor league affiliate, the year they played for the ValleyCats, and the team they debuted with (If debuted yet).

 Mark McLemore (2002, Houston Astros)
 Jailen Peguero (2002, Arizona Diamondbacks)
 Devern Hansack (2002, Boston Red Sox)
 Jason Hirsh (2003, Houston Astros)
 Matt Albers (2003, Houston Astros) (First ValleyCat in the Major Leagues)
 Josh Anderson (2003, Houston Astros)
 Edwin Maysonet (2003, Houston Astros)
 Ben Zobrist (2004, Tampa Bay Rays)
 Hunter Pence (2004, Houston Astros)
 Troy Patton (2004, Houston Astros)
 Chad Reineke (2004, San Diego Padres)
 Drew Sutton (2004, Cincinnati Reds)
 Tommy Manzella (2005, Houston Astros)
 Koby Clemens (2005)
 Felipe Paulino (2005, Houston Astros)
 Brian Bogusevic (2005–2006, Houston Astros)
 Chris Johnson (2006, Houston Astros)
 Bud Norris (2006, Houston Astros)
 Víctor Gárate (2006–2007, Washington Nationals)
 Fernando Abad (2007, Houston Astros)
 Brandon Barnes (2007, Houston Astros)
 Jason Castro (2008, Houston Astros)
 Jordan Lyles (2008, Houston Astros)
 J. B. Shuck (2008, Houston Astros)
 J. D. Martinez (2009, Houston Astros)
 José Altuve (2009, Houston Astros)
 Dallas Keuchel (2009, Houston Astros)
 Jake Goebbert (2009, San Diego Padres)
 Jorge de León (2009–2010, Houston Astros)
 David Martínez (2010, Houston Astros)
 Jake Buchanan, (2010, Houston Astros)
 Kiké Hernández (2010, Houston Astros)
 George Springer (2011, Houston Astros)
 Nick Tropeano (2011, Houston Astros)
 Matt Duffy (2011, San Francisco Giants)
 Dayán Díaz (2011, Cincinnati Reds)
 Preston Tucker (2012, Houston Astros)
 Vince Velasquez (2012, Houston Astros)
 Brady Rodgers (2012, Houston Astros)
 Juan Minaya (2012, Chicago White Sox)
 Tyler Heineman (2012, Miami Marlins)
 Chia-Jen Lo (2013, Houston Astros)
 Michael Feliz (2013, Houston Astros)
 Adrian Houser (2013, Milwaukee Brewers)
 Tyler White (2013, Houston Astros)
 Tony Kemp (2013, Houston Astros)
 Richard Rodríguez (2013, Baltimore Orioles)
 Jack Mayfield (2013, Houston Astros)
 Troy Scribner (2013–2014, Los Angeles Angels)
 Daniel Mengden (2014, Oakland Athletics)
 A. J. Reed (2014, Houston Astros)
 Joe Musgrove (2014, Houston Astros)
 Derek Fisher (2014, Houston Astros)
 J. D. Davis (2014, Houston Astros)
 Alfredo González (2014, Chicago White Sox)
 Jason Martin (2014, Pittsburgh Pirates)
 Ryan Thompson (2014, Tampa Bay Rays)
 David Paulino (2015, Houston Astros)
 Elieser Hernández (2015, Miami Marlins)
 Dean Deetz (2015, Houston Astros)
 Trent Thornton (2015, Toronto Blue Jays)
 Garrett Stubbs (2015, Houston Astros)
 Rogelio Armenteros (2015, Houston Astros)
 Zac Grotz (2015, Seattle Mariners)
 Ralph Garza Jr. (2015, Houston Astros)
 José Urquidy (2015; 2018, Houston Astros)
 Framber Valdez (2016, Houston Astros)
 Jake Rogers (2016, Detroit Tigers)
 Jorge Alcalá (2016, Minnesota Twins)
 Taylor Jones (2016, Houston Astros)
 Carlos Sanabria (2016, Houston Astros)
 Daz Cameron (2016, Detroit Tigers)
 Héctor Pérez (2016, Toronto Blue Jays)
 Ronnie Dawson (2016, Houston Astros)
 Alex De Goti (2016, Houston Astros)
 Ryan Hartman (2016, Houston Astros)
 Akeem Bostick (2016, New York Mets)
 Bryan De La Cruz (2016-2017, Miami Marlins)
 Corbin Martin (2017, Houston Astros)
 Patrick Sandoval (2017, Los Angeles Angels)
 Abraham Toro (2017, Houston Astros)
 Jonathan Araúz (2017, Boston Red Sox)
 Cristian Javier (2017, Houston Astros)
 Brandon Bielak (2017, Houston Astros)
 Tyler Ivey (2017, Houston Astros)
 Jake Meyers (2017, Houston Astros)
 Humberto Castellanos (2017–2018, Houston Astros)
 J. B. Bukauskas (2017–2018, Arizona Diamondbacks)
 Bryan Abreu (2018, Houston Astros)
 Nivaldo Rodríguez (2018, Houston Astros)
 Luis García (2018, Houston Astros)
 Gilberto Celestino (2018, Minnesota Twins)

Former/Current notable baseball players who played for the ValleyCats in the Frontier League, the year they played for the ValleyCats, and the team they returned with.

 Andrew Bellatti (2021, Miami Marlins)
 Denis Phipps (2021–2022)
 Willy García (2021–2022)
 Cito Culver (2022–present)
 Ryan Hartman (2022–present)

See also
 Sports in New York's Capital District

References

External links

 

2002 establishments in New York (state)
Baseball teams established in 2002
New York–Penn League teams
Frontier League teams
Houston Astros minor league affiliates
Professional baseball teams in New York (state)
Sports in Rensselaer County, New York
Troy, New York